College of the Sequoias (COS) is a public two-year community college in Visalia, California. The college is named for the Giant Sequoia trees native to the nearby Sierra Nevada mountain range.

History
College of the Sequoias was originally established in 1926 as Visalia Junior College as a department in the city high school. Its mission at that time was to provide inexpensive, lower-division college education to local high school graduates who intended to transfer to a traditional four-year college. Visalia Junior College was later expanded and a campus was built in 1938. The campus was built on what is still the college grounds. In 1949, it expanded further and formed the College of the Sequoias Community College District.

Campus and centers
College of the Sequoias' main campus is in Visalia, but it also has full-service centers in Hanford and Tulare.

Each location offers the full-range of general education offerings and students services, but each also features a flagship program. The Visalia main campus is the home of Nursing and Allied Health, the Hanford Center (opened in 2010) is the home of the Public Safety Academy, and the Tulare College Center (opened in 2012) is the home of Agriculture.

COS offers classes at many other locations. These include: Corcoran, Dinuba, Exeter, Farmersville, Hanford, Ivanhoe, Lemoore, Lindsay, Orosi, Porterville, Strathmore, Three Rivers, Tulare, and Woodlake.

Academics
The current enrollment of COS is 11,141 students, and the college offers a variety of transfer, vocational, and community-based classes, including the fire/police academies for Tulare and Kings counties. College of the Sequoias is accredited by the Accrediting Commission for Community and Junior Colleges (ACCJC).

Student life

Sports
The college athletics teams are nicknamed the Giants, and COS sponsors 14 teams which participate in the Central Valley Conference.

Notable alumni

Wilson Alvarez – American football player
Creed Bratton – American musician The Grass Roots and actor The Office
Bonnie Bryant – First golfer to win on the LPGA Tour playing left-handed
Joseph James DeAngelo - convicted as the Golden State Killer and the Visalia Ransacker in 2020, was a police officer in Exeter from 1973 to 1976, same time as when the Ransacker crimes occurred in neighbouring Visalia
Crystal Galindo – Xicana artist
DeeAndre Hulett – American basketball player
Dannie Lockett – American football player
Devin Nunes – U.S. Representative for 
Steve Perry – American singer and songwriter best known as the lead vocalist of the rock band Journey
J. G. Quintel – Animator who created the Regular Show for Cartoon Network
Sheldon Richardson - American football defensive tackle for the Cleveland Browns of the National Football League (NFL).
Windham Rotunda - American professional wrestler currently signed to the WWE under the ring name Bray Wyatt.
David Valadao – U.S. Representative for

References

External links
 Official webpage

 
California Community Colleges
Educational institutions established in 1926
Schools accredited by the Western Association of Schools and Colleges
Universities and colleges in Tulare County, California
1926 establishments in California